Tritonoharpa bayeri is a species of sea snail, a marine gastropod mollusk in the family Cancellariidae, the nutmeg snails.

Description
Original description: "Shell small for genus, very thin and fragile, inflated, bullate; spire low in comparison to cogeners, shoulder and spire tabulate; 2 very thin, bladelike, low varices per whorl; 16-18 very narrow, low, axial riblets between sets of varices; axial riblets overlaid with numerous raised spiral threads; parietal shield erect, nonadherent; edge of lip thin, bladelike, crenulated; color pale tan with numerous large, scattered, amorphous reddish-brown patches; varices marked with one large medial  reddish-brown checker-shaped flammule and smaller brown dashes; interior of aperture pale tan, with brown checkers of labial varix showing through."

Distribution
Locus typicus: "Off Cabo La Vela, Goajira Peninsula, Colombia."

References

Cancellariidae
Gastropods described in 1987